Superporto do Açu is a South Atlantic Ocean industrial port complex located in the municipality of São João da Barra in the Brazilian state of Rio de Janeiro.

References

External links
 Prumo Logistica

Ports and harbours of Brazil